Ndjili or N'Djili is a municipality (commune) in the Tshangu district of Kinshasa, the capital city of the Democratic Republic of the Congo.
It is named after the Ndjili River, which forms its western boundary.

Demographics

Transport 
It is served by a station on the Matadi-Kinshasa Railway. An agreement was made with Belgium in 2007 to upgrade this line.

See also 

 List of railway stations in the Democratic Republic of the Congo

References 

Communes of Kinshasa
Tshangu District